Perfect Couples is an American sitcom television series that was originally broadcast by NBC. The half-hour romantic comedy was co-created by Jon Pollack and Scott Silveri and produced by Universal Media Studios. A sneak preview of the series aired on December 20, 2010, and officially premiered on January 20, 2011, as a mid-season replacement for the 2010–11 television season. The show was filmed in Los Angeles.

On April 14, 2011, the show was replaced in its timeslot with The Paul Reiser Show which was cancelled 11 days later on April 25 after only two episodes. NBC officially canceled Perfect Couples on May 13, 2011.

Plot
Perfect Couples revolves around three couples at various stages in their relationships, yet who face similar problems. Vance and Amy are a couple who fight a lot and have a very active sex life. Rex and Leigh view  themselves as relationship experts and therefore a "perfect couple", while Dave and Julia are considered the normal pair to whom everyone can relate.

Cast
Kyle Bornheimer as Dave
Christine Woods as Julia
David Walton as Vance
Mary Elizabeth Ellis as Amy
Hayes MacArthur as Rex
Olivia Munn as Leigh
Nicolette Robinson as Isabella

Production

Development
In early February 2010, NBC announced that it had green-lighted a pilot script by creators Jon Pollack and Scott Silveri.  Olivia Munn was the first actress cast in mid-February. David Walton came on board the project in early March, followed soon by Mary Elizabeth Ellis and Hayes MacArthur. In late March 2010, Christine Woods was cast in what was described as the female lead. Kyle Howard rounded out the main cast in mid-April.

NBC announced a pick up of the series on May 12, 2010, which is currently planned as a midseason replacement.

On June 3, 2010, comedian and writer Jen Kirkman announced she would be leaving late-night show Chelsea Lately to join the writing staff for Perfect Couples.

On July 1, 2010, Deadline.com reported that Kyle Bornheimer had replaced Kyle Howard as Dave due to uncertainty whether the actor would be available due to TBS' decision to see how the fourth season of My Boys performed before deciding whether to renew or cancel the series. TBS cancelled the series less than three months later.

Cancellation
On March 22, 2011, it was announced that The Paul Reiser Show would replace Perfect Couples, even though the show still had two unaired episodes remaining.  Mid-April is not a typical time for a prime-time network television show to finish its run, leading many to believe the show may be canceled.  However, the premiere of The Paul Reiser Show fared even worse in the ratings, showing even more uncertainty for the timeslot, and was itself canceled after only two episodes.  Perfect Couples was officially cancelled on May 13, 2011.

Episodes

Reception
On December 20, 2010, NBC aired a sneak preview of the series after the season finale of the reality show The Sing-Off. The series received mixed reviews, scoring a 43 out of 100 based on 19 critics on Metacritic. Entertainment Weekly critic Ken Tucker said the show has improved since the first episodes.

The show was the lowest rated scripted series on NBC, with about 3 million viewers on average, until it was replaced by The Paul Reiser Show, which fared even worse.

References

External links

2010 American television series debuts
2011 American television series endings
2010s American romantic comedy television series
English-language television shows
NBC original programming
Television series by Universal Television
Television shows set in Oregon
Television shows set in Portland, Oregon
2010s American single-camera sitcoms